John David LeMay (born May 29, 1962) is a former American actor who has starred in TV shows and in films.

Biography
LeMay was born in Saint Paul, Minnesota and moved to Normal, Illinois in his teens. He went to Normal Community High School and participated in school plays and got into both singing and acting. LeMay went to Illinois State University and got a Bachelor of Science degree and completed a double major in music and musical theatre. He moved to Los Angeles in 1985 to star on TV. He appeared on hit TV shows like The Facts of Life.

In the late 1980s, LeMay became known for his role in the cult horror TV series Friday the 13th: The Series as Ryan Dallion from 1987-1989. In 1993, he went on to play Steven Freeman in Jason Goes to Hell: The Final Friday.

He also starred in two short-lived TV series, Eddie Dodd and Over My Dead Body.

In recent years John has returned to his musical theater roots starring in a regional production of Legally Blonde in 2014.

Selected filmography

External links
 
 http://johndlemay.tripod.com/main2.html
 http://www.olaf-eichler.de/friday/pics_nf.shtml

1962 births
American male film actors
American male television actors
Living people
Male actors from Saint Paul, Minnesota
Male actors from Illinois